Lin Yungai (2 February 1881 – 4 October 1948) was a Chinese politician also known as Gongjing or by the courtesy name Yigong.

Career
Lin received his early education at a school in Gaozhou. In 1909, he began attending a school in Guangzhou. He joined the Tongmenghui while still a student. In Guangzhou, Lin met Zhu Zhixin and participated in the Yellow Flower Mound Uprising of 1911. The next year, he graduated and took part in a Gaozhou based revolt.

Lin pursued further study in law and politics at St. John's University in New York City, returning to China in 1918. Throughout the 1920s, Lin held several government posts in Guangdong. He was first named Mayor of Guangzhou in 1923, and later served as Chairman of the Guangzhou City Council in 1927, before assuming the mayoralty for a second time between 1928 and 1931. Lin then served as Vice Chairman of the Guangdong Provincial Government under Chen Jitang and Lin Yizhong between 1931 and 1936. He succeeded Huang Musong as minister of the Mongolian and Tibetan Affairs Commission later that year, but was shortly thereafter named auditor-general of the Republic of China. Lin held the post until his death on 4 October 1948.

References 

1881 births
1948 deaths
Republic of China politicians from Guangdong
Mayors of Guangzhou
Politicians from Maoming